Bald Bluff Township is one of eleven townships in Henderson County, Illinois, USA.  As of the 2010 census, its population was 334 and it contained 159 housing units.

Geography

Unincorporated towns
 Bald Bluff at 
(This list is based on USGS data and may include former settlements.)

Cemeteries
The township contains Belmont Cemetery.

Airports and landing strips
 Earl J Meyer Airport
 Meyer Landing Strip
 Shissler Seed Company Incorporated Airport

Demographics

School districts
 Aledo Community Unit School District 201
 United Community School District 304
 West Central Community Unit School District 235
 Westmer Community Unit School District 203

Political districts
 Illinois's 17th congressional district
 State House District 94
 State Senate District 47

References
 United States Census Bureau 2008 TIGER/Line Shapefiles
 
 United States National Atlas

External links
 City-Data.com
 Illinois State Archives
 Township Officials of Illinois

Townships in Henderson County, Illinois
1906 establishments in Illinois
Populated places established in 1906
Townships in Illinois
Illinois populated places on the Mississippi River